Oenomaus myrteana is a species of butterfly of the family Lycaenidae. It occurs in lowland wet forest from eastern Ecuador to western Brazil (Rondônia).

The length of the forewings is 12.8 mm for males and 12.1 mm for females.

Etymology
The name of the species refers to the striking resemblance between the ventral hindwing of this species and that of Enos myrtea.

References

Insects described in 2012
Eumaeini
Lycaenidae of South America